Heliophanus bisulcus is a jumping spider species in the genus Heliophanus.  It was first described by Wanda Wesołowska in 1986 and is found in Namibia and South Africa. What had been designated the species Heliophanus villosus was recognised as the female of this species in 2003.

References

Spiders described in 1986
Fauna of Namibia
Salticidae
Spiders of Africa
Spiders of South Africa
Taxa named by Wanda Wesołowska